Fort George was an extension to the fortified walls of Bombay (now Mumbai) built in 1769; it was in the present-day Fort area, to the east of the site of the former Dongri Fort. The hill on which the  Dongri fort stood was razed, and in its place Fort George was built. In 1862, the fort was demolished.

History
Its length ran from NNE to SSW, and it was named in honour of George III of the United Kingdom.

See also
List of forts in Maharashtra

References

18th Century History of Mumbai
Fort+George,+Bombay A Handbook for India: Being an Account of the Three Presidencies and of the Overland Route

Forts around Mumbai
History of Mumbai
1862 disestablishments
1769 establishments in the British Empire
18th-century forts in India
Demolished buildings and structures in India
Buildings and structures demolished in 1862